William Jarvis Street (June 16, 1784 – December 18, 1847) (also recorded as William I. Street) was a member of the Connecticut House of Representatives from Norwalk from 1817 to 1818. and a Warden of the Borough of Norwalk from 1842 to 1845.

He was the son of John Street, and Silvia Bessey. He was the father of William C. Street, who took over his father's hardware business, and also served as Warden of the Borough of Norwalk.

References 

 AN ACT INCORPORATING THE BOROUGH OF NORWALK

1784 births
1847 deaths
American militiamen in the War of 1812
Mayors of Norwalk, Connecticut
Members of the Connecticut House of Representatives
Hardware merchants
19th-century American politicians